BHU is an abbreviation for Banaras Hindu University, Varanasi, India.

BHU may also refer to:
The Kingdom of Bhutan, IOC and UNDP code
Baltimore Hebrew University, now part of Towson University, Towson, Maryland, U.S.
Bhavnagar Airport, the IATA code for the airport in India
Banco Hipotecario del Uruguay, a Uruguayan mortgage bank
Barrett Hodgson University, Karachi, Pakistan
 Behavioral Health Unit, also known as a psychiatric unit